In Mesopotamian mythology, Lamashtu (Akkadian dLa-maš-tu; Sumerian Dimme dDim3-me or Kamadme) was a female demon, monster, malevolent goddess or demigoddess who menaced women during childbirth and, if possible, kidnapped their children while they were breastfeeding. She would gnaw on their bones and suck their blood, as well as being charged with a number of other evil deeds. She was a daughter of the Sky God Anu.

Lamashtu is depicted as a mythological hybrid, with a hairy body, a lioness' head with donkey's teeth and ears, long fingers and fingernails, and the feet of a bird with sharp talons. She is often shown standing or kneeling on a donkey, nursing a pig and a dog, and holding snakes. She thus bears some functions and resemblance to the demon Lilith in Jewish mythology.

Mythology
Lamashtu's father was the Sky God Anu. Unlike many other usual demonic figures and depictions in Mesopotamian lore, Lamashtu was said to act in malevolence of her own accord, rather than at the gods' instructions. Along with this her name was written together with the cuneiform determinative indicating deity. This means she was a goddess or a demigoddess in her own right.

She bore seven names and was described as seven witches in incantations. Her evil deeds included (but were not limited to): slaying children, unborns, and neonates; causing harm to mothers and expectant mothers; eating men and drinking their blood; disturbing sleep; bringing nightmares; killing foliage; infesting rivers and lakes; and being a bringer of disease, sickness, and death.

Pazuzu, a god or demon, was invoked to protect birthing mothers and infants against Lamashtu's malevolence, usually on amulets and statues. Although Pazuzu was said to be bringer of famine and drought, he was also invoked against evil for protection, and against plague, but he was primarily and popularly invoked against his fierce, malicious rival Lamashtu.

Incantation against Lamaštu:
 	

In another incantation against her, she appears to be identified with Inanna:

In modern culture
 
 Lamashtu is a demon lord and the goddess of monsters, called the Mother of Beasts and Mistress of Insanity, in the role-playing game setting Pathfinder.
 Lamashtu appears as a character in the NBC television series Constantine in the episode "The Saint of Last Resorts".
 Lamashtu is the title of a 2015 audiobook by Paul E Cooley.
 Lamashtu appears as an antagonist in the 2018 novel "On Devil's Wings" by M. J. Meade.
 Lamashtu appears as the antagonist in the 2017 film Still/Born.
 The song "lamashtu" by Necrophobic on their 2018 album "Mark of the Necrogram" is named for Lamashtu.
 Lamashtu is depicted on the Ankaran Sarcophagus in the videogame Vampire: The Masquerade – Bloodlines.
 Lamashtu appears in the book "Sebitti - Mesopotamian Magick & Demonology" by Michael W. Ford. 
 The 2020 album "Scourge of Lamashtu" by Black Funeral is themed after Lamashtu.

Ritual
An Akkadian incantation and ritual against Lamashtu is edited in Texte aus der Umwelt des Alten Testaments vol. 2 (1988)
It is glossed as an "incantation to dispel lasting fever and Lamashtu".
The prescribed ritual involves a Lamashtu figurine. A sacrifice of bread must be placed before the figurine and water must be poured over it. A black dog must be made to carry the figurine. Then it is placed near the head of the sick child for three days, with the heart of a piglet placed in its mouth. The incantation must be recited three times a day, besides further food sacrifices. At dusk on the third day, the figurine is taken outdoors and buried near the wall.

See also

Abyzou
Akhkhazu
Alû
Lamia
Lilin
Lilith
Shedim
Utukku

References

External links

Mesopotamian goddesses
Mesopotamian demons
Mythological hybrids
Mythological hematophages
Female legendary creatures
Snake goddesses
Evil goddesses
Mesopotamian underworld
Mythological cannibals
Donkey deities